União is the Portuguese word for Union.  It may refer to:
the Brazilian federal government
União do Vegetal, a church known for its usage of Hoasca as tea
Brazilian frigate União (F45), a general-purpose Niterói class frigate launched 1975 and completed 1980

 Cities
União, Guinea-Bissau

 Places in Brazil
União dos Palmares, a city in the state of Alagoas
União da Vitória, a city in the state of Paraná
União, Piauí, a town in the state of Piauí

 Football (soccer) clubs
C.F. União, aka União Madeira, Portuguese football club that plays in the Madeira Islands
União Agrícola Barbarense Futebol Clube, Brazilian football club
União São João Esporte Clube, Brazilian football club
União Bandeirante Futebol Clube, Brazilian football club
União Esporte Clube, Brazilian football club
União Futebol Clube, Brazilian football club
Sociedade Esportiva União Cacoalense, Brazilian football club
União de São Lourenço, Cape Verdean football club
C.D. União Micaelense, Portuguese football club
União Esportiva, Brazilian football club
União Recreativa dos Trabalhadores, Brazilian football club
União Recreativo Social Olímpico, Brazilian football club
União de Marechal Hermes Futebol Clube, Brazilian football club
União Central Futebol Clube, Brazilian football club
União Frederiquense de Futebol, Brazilian football club
Esporte Clube União Suzano, Brazilian football club
União Suzano Atlético Clube, Brazilian football club